Tamao Yoshida (吉田 玉男; January 7, 1919 – September 24, 2006) was a Japanese puppeteer. He is a 2003 recipient of the Kyoto Prize in Arts and Philosophy.

References 
http://www.kyotoprize.org/en/laureates/tamao_yoshida/

1919 births
2006 deaths
Japanese puppeteers
Kyoto laureates in Arts and Philosophy